The King of Attolia is a young adult fantasy novel by Megan Whalen Turner, published by the Greenwillow Books imprint of HarperCollins in 2006. It is the third novel in the Queen's Thief series that Turner inaugurated with The Thief in 1996.

Setting 

The books are set in a Byzantine-like imaginary landscape, reminiscent of ancient Greece and other territories around the Mediterranean. The action takes place in the countries of Eddis, Attolia and Sounis. The character's names are also Greek, and references are made to actual Greek authors. The gods of Turner's pantheon, ruled by the Great Goddess Hephestia, are her own, and her world possesses items such as guns and pocket watches.

Plot 

Eugenides, the one-handed former Thief of Eddis, has married the Queen of Attolia, bringing peace to the two countries and becoming king. He appears to sleep during important briefings, makes snide remarks, wears ridiculous clothes and refuses to be more than a figurehead, letting the Queen rule as she has always done. The Attolian court resents him as a young foreign upstart who appears to also be an ineffectual fool.

The story is told largely from the point of view of Costis, a young soldier in the Queen's Guard. When the king insults Teleus, Captain of the Guard, Costis loses control and knocks the king down. He expects to be executed, but the king spares his life and makes him into a reluctant confidant. Costis finds the king obnoxious and conniving, but slowly begins to have some sympathy for him as a young man far from his mountain home in Eddis, married to the beautiful but ruthless Queen.

The plot twists through an assassination attempt and political intrigues involving the traitorous Baron Erondites and his sons, Relius, the Queen’s master of spies, and Eugenides's old enemy, Nahuseresh of the (fictionalized) Mede Empire. Costis discovers there is more to the king and gains a clearer understanding of the young man’s abilities, motives, and relationship with the Queen. Costis finds his own life and reputation at risk, and the fate of three nations hinges on Eugenides's internal struggle to accept his own destiny as the King of Attolia.

Reviews 
The King of Attolia received starred reviews from School Library Journal, The Horn Book, Kirkus Reviews, and Library Media Connection, as well as positive reviews from other sources.  It was a School Library Journal Best Book, an ALA Top 10 Best Book for Young Adults, was on the Horn Book Fanfare list, the New York Public Library Books for the Teen Age list, and the Dorothy Canfield Fisher Children's Book Award Masterlist.

Queen's Thief series 

 1996 The Thief
 2000 The Queen of Attolia
 2006 The King of Attolia
 2010 A Conspiracy of Kings
 2017 Thick as Thieves
 2020 Return of the Thief

References

External links 

Megan Whalen Turner (official)
Sounis fan discussion of the series at LiveJournal
 

2006 American novels
Young adult fantasy novels
American fantasy novels
American young adult novels
2006 fantasy novels
HarperCollins books